The 1949–50 NBA season was the only season for the Sheboygan Red Skins in the National Basketball Association (NBA).

Roster
{| class="toccolours" style="font-size: 95%; width: 100%;"|}
|-
! colspan="2" style="background-color: #D0103A;  color: #FFFFFF; text-align: center;" | Sheboygan Red Skins 1949–50 roster
|- style="background-color: #FFFFFF; color: #D0103A;   text-align: center;"
! Players !! Coaches
|-
| valign="top" |
{| class="sortable" style="background:transparent; margin:0px; width:100%;"|}
! Pos. !! # !! Nat. !! Name !! Ht. !! Wt. !! From
|-

Regular season

Season standings

Record vs. opponents

Game log

Playoffs

West Division Semifinals
(1) Indianapolis Olympians vs. (4) Sheboygan Red Skins: Olympians win series 2-1
Game 1 @ Indianapolis (March 21): Indianapolis 86, Sheboygan 85
Game 2 @ Sheboygan (March 23): Sheboygan 95, Indianapolis 85
Game 3 @ Indianapolis (March 25): Indianapolis 91, Sheboygan 84

This was the first playoff meeting between the Olympians and Red Skins.

References

Sheboygan Red Skins seasons
Sheboygan